Roggan may refer to:

 Roggan Lake, a lake in Western Quebec
 Roggan River, Quebec, a small village in Northern Quebec
 Roggan River, a river in Northern Quebec.

See also
 Roggen, surname
 Rogan, surname